Zangiwal is a village located in the Loralai District of Pakistan.

Populated places in Loralai District